The 1981 Auburn Tigers football team represented Auburn University in the NCAA Division I college football season of 1981. Competing as a member of the Southeastern Conference (SEC), the team was led by head coach Pat Dye, in his first year, and played their home games at Jordan–Hare Stadium in Auburn, Alabama. They finished the season with a record of 5–6 (2–4 in the SEC).

Schedule

Personnel

Game summaries

Florida

References

Auburn
Auburn Tigers football seasons
Auburn Tigers football